Yogo may refer to:
YOGO - a brand of sustainable yoga travel gear
YoGo - an Australian snack
Yogo sapphire - a variety of sapphire found in Yogo Gulch, Montana
Yogo, Shiga - a town in Japan
Yogo (yoga) - a children's exercise based on yoga featured on the program Waybuloo
Yogo Island, island on Lake Chad in Chad

See also
iögo (pronounced "yogo") – a Canadian brand of yogurt